Ortholexis holocausta, the cinnamon scarce sprite, is a species of butterfly in the family Hesperiidae. It is found in Sierra Leone, Ivory Coast, Ghana, Nigeria, Cameroon, the Republic of the Congo, the Democratic Republic of the Congo and north-western Zambia. The habitat consists of forests.

References

Butterflies described in 1891
Hesperiidae
Butterflies of Africa